Lathrop Building may refer to:

Lathrop Building (Fairbanks, Alaska), former home of the Fairbanks Daily News-Miner, formerly owned by Austin E. Lathrop
Lathrop Building (Anchorage, Alaska), housing the Fourth Avenue Theatre, radio and television stations owned by Lathrop